Notre-Dame-de-Pontmain is a municipality in the Laurentides region of Quebec, Canada, part of the Antoine-Labelle Regional County Municipality.

The village itself is located between Camp and Dudley Lakes in the Lièvre River watershed.

History
European colonization began when logging companies started to exploit the forests of the Du Lièvre River in the second half of the 19th century. By 1881, there were 35 families in the village.

In 1884, the local parish was formed which extended over the territory of Wabassee, Dudley, and Bouthillier geographic townships. The first pastor, Eugene Trinquier, serving from 1886 to 1907, was originally from Gap in the Hautes-Alpes (France) and named the parish Notre-Dame-de-Pontmain, after the apparitions of Our Lady of Pontmain.

On January 26, 1894, the Municipal Corporation of the United Townships of Wabassee-Dudley-et-Bouthillier was formed, becoming one of the oldest municipalities in the regional county. In 1897, its first bridge was built. In 1898, the first school opened, followed by the first general store in 1900, and the sawmill in 1902.

In 1945, it was renamed to Notre-Dame-de-Pontmain.

Demographics

Private dwellings occupied by usual residents (2021): 411 (total dwellings: 746)

Mother tongue:
 English as first language: 1.4%
 French as first language: 95.8%
 English and French as first language: 1.4%
 Other as first language: 1.4%

See also
 List of municipalities in Quebec

References

Incorporated places in Laurentides
Municipalities in Quebec